The Banghwa Bridge crosses the Han River in South Korea and connects the Gangseo-gu in Seoul and Goyang in Gyeonggi Province. The bridge is a part of the Incheon International Airport Expressway. At over 2.5 km in length, it is the longest bridge to cross the Han River. Though mostly a girder bridge, the middle 540m section is an arch truss, resembling the shape of an airplane taking off.

References

Bridges in Seoul
Bridges completed in 2000
Bridges over the Han River (Korea)
Toll bridges in South Korea